C/2007 F1 (LONEOS) is a hyperbolic comet discovered on March 19, 2007 as part as the Lowell Observatory Near Earth Object Search (LONEOS). The comet reached perihelion, or closest approach to the sun on October 28, 2007.

The comet reached 6th magnitude in October, making it easily visible in binoculars, and just barely visible to the naked eye for observers in the Northern Hemisphere, just after sunset in the west. It reached a  max brightness of magnitude 5 around perihelion, before starting to slowly dim on its way out of the solar system. It continued to move south in the sky and became visible to southern hemisphere comet chasers in mid November.

The comet was also observed from both the STEREO spacecraft, first by STEREO-B on October 22 and then by STEREO-A for several days starting from October 28 as the comet had just passed perihelion and was receding from the Sun.

References

External links 
 C/2007 F1 at Cometography
 24 Minute telescope Time Lapse
 Video of path
 NASA Java Applet Orbital Diagram

20070319
Cometary object articles
20071028
Non-periodic comets
Hyperbolic comets